Bailey Yard is the world’s largest railroad classification yard.  Employees sort, service and repair locomotives and cars headed all across North America. Owned and operated by the Union Pacific Railroad (UP), Bailey Yard is located in North Platte, Nebraska. The yard is named after former Union Pacific president Edd H. Bailey.

Facilities
Bailey Yard is halfway between Denver and Omaha. Bailey Yard has 200 separate tracks totaling  of track, 985 switches, 766 turnouts, and 17 receiving and 16 departure tracks. Union Pacific employs more than 2,600 people in North Platte, most of whom are responsible for the day-to-day operations of Bailey Yard.

An average of 139 trains and over 14,000 railroad cars pass through Bailey Yard every day. The yard sorts approximately 3,000 cars daily using the yard’s two humps. These are used to sort four cars per minute into one of the 114 "bowl" tracks -- 49 tracks for the westbound trains, and 65 for eastbound. The bowl tracks are used to form trains headed for destinations across North America, including the East, West and Gulf coasts of the United States, and Canadian and Mexican borders.

The yard also includes 3 locomotive fueling and servicing centers called eastbound run thru, westbound run thru, and a service track that handles more than 8,500 locomotives per month, a locomotive repair shop that can repair 750 locomotives monthly, and a car repair facility that can handle nearly 50 cars daily. The car repair shop replaces 10,000 wheel-sets each year. The yard features an in-motion wheel defect detector developed by Union Pacific that uses ultrasound technology to inspect each wheel. It is the only such detector in the world. UP has also developed a method for changing wheels in the field on empty westbound coal trains, which enables four workers to use a hydraulic jack under the couplers between two cars and exchange the trucks. This has reduced the time needed to replace trucks from up to 12 days to 8–12 minutes.

Locomotives can be serviced in a NASCAR-like pit stop facility called a Run-Thru staffed by five different crafts—an electrician, machinist, fireman, oiler, and car inspector. Locomotives are serviced in 45 minutes without detaching them from their trains. The cars go through the car department to get fixed, while the diesel locomotives go to the diesel shop.

Because of the enormous amount of products that pass through Bailey Yard, Union Pacific describes the yard as an “economic barometer of America.”

History
North Platte was first platted as a railroad town by chief engineer Grenville Dodge. He chose the location because of the availability of good water nearby, and its distance from Grand Island, Nebraska. The town, first known as "Hell on Wheels", received its first train in 1866. Dodge then constructed major shop facilities and winter quarters for its crews. In 1867 it began conducting main line operations through the town.  The early yard was a flat-switched yard with 20 tracks.

Buffalo Bill located Scouts Rest Ranch at North Platte because it allowed him to move his Wild West Show by train or by wagon across the United States relatively quickly. From 1941 to 1946, the North Platte Canteen served baked goods and refreshments to more than six million service members during a 10-minute stop as they were convoyed across the United States. After 105 years, passenger service was discontinued in 1971.

North Platte became a division point for UP, where trains are sorted, railroad crews are exchanged, and maintenance or repairs are performed on equipment. Bailey Yard was updated after World War II in 1948 as a hump yard with 42 tracks. Another hump yard with 64 tracks was added in 1968, followed by a diesel locomotive shop in 1971, and a railroad car shop in 1974. In 1980, the 1948 hump yard was replaced with a new 50-track yard.

In 1995, as a result of its massive size, the yard was recognized in the Guinness Book of Records as the largest rail yard in the world. It was featured on the "Freight Trains" episode of Modern Marvels on The History Channel.

See also
List of rail yards

References

Further reading

External links

Golden Spike Tower and Visitor Center

Properties of the Union Pacific Railroad
Landmarks in Nebraska
Rail infrastructure in Nebraska
North Platte, Nebraska
Rail yards in the United States
Buildings and structures in Lincoln County, Nebraska